The uterine isthmus is the inferior-posterior part of uterus, on its cervical end — here the uterine muscle (myometrium) is narrower and thinner. It connects the body and cervix.

The uterine isthmus can become more compressibile in pregnancy, which is a finding known as Hegar's sign.

References 

Uterus